Tianwei Township is a rural township in Changhua County, Taiwan. It has a population total of 26,063 and an area of 24.03 square kilometres.

Administrative divisions
Tianwei, Xipan, Dalian, Zhengyi, Beizeng, Nanzeng, Raoping, Fengtian, Renli, Xincuo, Xiding, Liufeng, Liufeng, Haifeng, Muyi, Xinsheng, Beizeng, Nanzeng, Futian and Xinxing Village.

Economy
Tianwei is a traditional center of the floriculture industry and is known as the “land of flowers."

Notable natives
 Chiu Chuang-huan, Vice Premier (1981-1984)
 Lo Fu-chu, member of Legislative Yuan (1996–2002)

References

External links

 Tianwei Government website

Townships in Changhua County